Lockhart Lake is a small saltwater lake in Little Ridge, Harvey Parish, New Brunswick, Canada.
It is approximately 15 minutes driving distance from Alma, New Brunswick.
Tourists can kayak from the Cape Enrage river into it.

See also
List of lakes of New Brunswick

References

Landforms of Albert County, New Brunswick
Lakes of New Brunswick
Saline lakes of Canada
Tourist attractions in Albert County, New Brunswick